Missouri School for the Deaf (MSD) is a school that serves deaf and hard-of-hearing students from ages 5–21 years old. Its campus is located in Fulton, Missouri. It serves students who live in Missouri.

It has grades K-12 and it was established in 1851. The internal academic divisions are: Stark Elementary School, Wheeler Middle School, and Wheeler High School.

In 1997 its enrollment was about 65–70, with about 33% having additional disabilities.

Campus
Elementary and middle school students are in cottages built in 1997; they are Gannon Cottage, named after Jack R. Gannon; Redden Cottage, after Laura Redden Searing (Howard Glyndon); and Reid Cottage, after teacher William Cooper Reid. Prior to 1997 they were in Stark Hall's dormitories. High school students are in Kerr Hall, named after MSD founder William Dabney Kerr; and Tate Hall, named after MSD superintendent James Nolley Tate. They have separate sides for female and male students.

Athletics
 MSD's sports teams usually play other schools categorized as 1A, and it plays against other schools for the deaf in the Great Plains tournament.

Notable alumni
 Jack R. Gannon, teacher, coach, and author
 CJ Jones, actor

References

External links
 

Public K-12 schools in the United States
Public elementary schools in Missouri
Public middle schools in Missouri
Public high schools in Missouri
Schools in Callaway County, Missouri
Schools for the deaf in the United States
Public boarding schools in the United States
Boarding schools in Missouri